Edward Mayfield Boyle (21 June 1874 – 21 November 1936) was a Sierra Leone Creole medical doctor who attended Harvard Medical School. Boyle, was one of the first West Africans to attend Howard University College of Medicine and was the maternal uncle of Edna Elliott-Horton, who was possibly the first West African woman to graduate from Howard University.

Early life
Edward Mayfield Boyle was born on 21 June 1874 in Freetown, Sierra Leone, to Charles Boyle and Sarah Easmon, who was of African-American descent and a member of the Easmon family. Boyle was a maternal nephew of Albert Whiggs Easmon, a leading physician and surgeon in Freetown, and John Farrell Easmon, one-time Chief Medical Officer of the Gold Coast who coined the term "Blackwater fever".

Boyle attended the Wesleyan (Methodist) Boys' High School in Freetown, and attended Zion Methodist Church, Wilberforce Street, a Settler church founded by the early African-American founders of the Colony of Sierra Leone and the settlement of Freetown. He was an ideological disciple of Edward Wilmot Blyden, a Caribbean pan-Africanist scholar who taught in Liberia and Sierra Leone.

Education and medical career
Boyle obtained a scholarship and financial assistance to attend Howard University College of Medicine and qualified as a medical doctor. Boyle completed courses at Harvard Medical School and Meharry Medical College.

Death
Boyle died in Baltimore, Maryland, on 21 November 1936 and was survived by his wife and several children.

Sources
Adell Patton Jr., Physicians, Colonial Racism, and Diaspora in West Africa
"Boyle, Edward Mayfield", Who's Who in Colored America: A Biographical Dictionary of Notable Living Persons of African Descent in America (New York: Who's Who in Colored America Corporation, 1937)

Sierra Leone Creole people
Easmon family (Sierra Leone)
Sierra Leonean people of African-American descent
Expatriates from British Sierra Leone in the United States
Howard University College of Medicine alumni
African-American physicians
Harvard Medical School alumni
1874 births
1935 deaths